The McAvinney Fourplex is a historic apartment building located in the northeast quadrant of Portland, Oregon, United States. It was listed on the National Register of Historic Places in 2006.

See also
National Register of Historic Places listings in Northeast Portland, Oregon

References

External links

1913 establishments in Oregon
Houses completed in 1913
Irvington, Portland, Oregon
Apartment buildings on the National Register of Historic Places in Portland, Oregon
Neoclassical architecture in Oregon